Andreas Lars Johansson (born May 19, 1973) is a Swedish former professional ice hockey player, currently a head coach for Modo Hockey. Johansson played professionally in the Swedish Elite League, Swiss National League A, the National Hockey League, and in the Russian Superleague. He returned to Sweden in 2009 where he finished his career. He was an assistant coach for Modo Hockey in the 2010–11 season.

Career
Johansson began his pro career with Färjestad BK in Sweden. He was drafted 136th overall by the New York Islanders in the 1991 NHL Entry Draft and played in the NHL for the Islanders (1995–96), Pittsburgh Penguins (1996–98), Ottawa Senators (1998–99), Tampa Bay Lightning (1999), Calgary Flames (1999–2000), New York Rangers (2001–02), and Nashville Predators (2002–04). In the 2000–01 season he played with the Swiss club SC Bern and after the 2003–04 season he went back to Switzerland where he signed with Genève-Servette HC and played with them for two seasons. In 2006/07 he returned to Färjestad. In 2007, he signed with Russian Super League team SKA Saint Petersburg. He played there for one season, but was contracted for two seasons (he did not play in the second season). Johansson then signed with Leksands IF of the HockeyAllsvenskan in 2009. However, he only played one game with Leksand before announcing his retirement due to injury.

Prior to the 2010–11 season, he signed as assistant coach of Modo Hockey of the Elitserien. He left the club after the end of the season due to family issues. In January 2011, he was named assistant coach for Färjestad BK of the Elitserien.

Career statistics

Regular season and playoffs

International

References

External links
 

1973 births
Calgary Flames players
Cleveland Lumberjacks players
Expatriate ice hockey players in Russia
Färjestad BK players
Genève-Servette HC players
Ice hockey players at the 1998 Winter Olympics
Leksands IF players
Living people
Milwaukee Admirals players
Nashville Predators players
New York Islanders draft picks
New York Islanders players
New York Rangers players
Olympic ice hockey players of Sweden
Ottawa Senators players
People from Hofors Municipality
Pittsburgh Penguins players
SC Bern players
SKA Saint Petersburg players
Swedish expatriate ice hockey players in Canada
Swedish expatriate sportspeople in Russia
Swedish expatriate ice hockey players in the United States
Swedish ice hockey left wingers
Tampa Bay Lightning players
Utah Grizzlies (IHL) players
Worcester IceCats players
Sportspeople from Gävleborg County
Expatriate ice hockey players in Switzerland
Swedish expatriate sportspeople in Switzerland